Copper Angel is a 1984 Soviet action film directed by Veniamyn Dorman and starring Anatoly Kuznetsov, Leonid Kuravlyov and Aleksandr Filippenko.

Plot
The international geological expedition headed by Soviet engineer Kurmaev (Anatoly Kuznetsov), is doing research with the purpose of construction of hydroelectric power station in a remote mountain area of a Latin American country. Hotel Copper Angel forms the base of the expedition, a refuge for the brothers Valdes gang who are selling illegal drugs and a target for the reactionary organization.

Cast
 Anatoly Kuznetsov   as   Kurmayev 
 Irina Shevchuk   as Marina Gromova, geologist
 Valentin Smirnitsky    as  Vladislav  
 Leonid Yarmolnik    as Maurice Barro
 Leonid Kuravlyov     as Larsen
 Aleksandr Filippenko   as Santiliano   
 Archil Gomiashvili     as Antonio Valdéz
 Nikolai Yeremenko Jr.  as Sebastien Valdez
 Alim Kouliev     as  Jose Kodrero   
 Liya Akhedzhakova    as Rosita
 Rostislav Yankovsky    as Levon, politician
 Vadim Zakharchenko as Max
 Alexander Yakovlev as Vaqueros

References

External links

1984 films
1980s crime action films
1980s Russian-language films
Soviet crime action films
Russian crime action films
Gorky Film Studio films